Frederick William Abercrombie Sigmont (14 May 1873 – 30 July 1950) was an Australian rules footballer who played for South Melbourne in the Victorian Football League (VFL).

Originally from Carlton Juniors, Sigmont played six games with Williamstown Football Club in the 1894 VFA season. The next season he transferred to Carlton but did not make a senior appearance in his time with the club. Sigmont played six times with South Melbourne in 1897, the inaugural VFL season, and took part in their first ever match in the league.

As a goal umpire, Sigmont officiated in the 1909 VFL Grand Final, which his former club won. In all he made umpired in 108 games, before retiring in 1915.

References

External links

1873 births
1950 deaths
Williamstown Football Club players
Sydney Swans players
Australian Football League umpires
Australian rules footballers from Melbourne
People from Collingwood, Victoria